Arkaqua Creek is a stream in the U.S. state of Georgia. It is a tributary to the Nottely River.

Arkaqua Creek was named after a local Cherokee tribesman. Variant spellings are "Arkagua Creek" and "Arkaquia Creek".

References

Rivers of Georgia (U.S. state)
Rivers of Union County, Georgia